Hing Man Estate is a public housing estate in Chai Wan, Hong Kong Island, Hong Kong located at the north of Hing Wah Estate and near Pamela Youde Nethersole Eastern Hospital. It consists of three Cruciform-typed residential blocks completed in 1982.

Shan Tsui Court is a Home Ownership Scheme court in Chai Wan, next to Hing Man Estate. It has four residential blocks completed in 1981.

Houses

Hing Man Estate

Shan Tsui Court

Demographics
According to the 2016 by-census, Hing Man Estate had a population of 5,795. The median age was 46.6 and the majority of residents (97.8 per cent) were of Chinese ethnicity. The average household size was 3.1 people. The median monthly household income of all households (i.e. including both economically active and inactive households) was HK$23,550.

Politics
For the 2019 District Council election, the estate fell within two constituencies. Hing Man Estate is located in the Hing Man constituency, which was formerly represented by Tse Miu-yee until July 2021, while Shan Tsui Court falls within the Lok Hong constituency, which was formerly represented by Tsang Kin-shing until July 2021.

Education
Shan Tsui Court is in Primary One Admission (POA) School Net 16. Within the school net are multiple aided schools (operated independently but funded with government money) and two government schools: Shau Kei Wan Government Primary School and Aldrich Bay Government Primary School.

See also

Public housing estates in Chai Wan and Siu Sai Wan

References

Chai Wan
Public housing estates in Hong Kong
Residential buildings completed in 1982
1982 establishments in Hong Kong